Presidential elections were held in El Salvador on 1 February 1842. Antonio José Cañas ran unopposed and was elected by the legislature, but he never assumed office.

Results

References

El Salvador
President
Election and referendum articles with incomplete results
Presidential elections in El Salvador
Single-candidate elections
Annulled elections